Tolu-e-Islam, also known as Bazm-e-Tolu-e-Islam, is an organization which focuses on understanding the Quran via logic, empiricism, and the appropriate application of the rules of Classical Arabic. The words Tolu-e-Islam, meaning "dawn" or "resurgence" of Islam, were taken from "Tulu'i Islam", the title of a poem by the philosopher and poet Muhammad Iqbal.

History and philosophy 
The movement was initiated by Muhammad Iqbal, and later spearheaded by Ghulam Ahmed Pervez.
In his writings and speeches, Ghulam Ahmed Pervez, who succeeded Iqbal as Tolu-e-Islam's lead scholar, has deductively analyzed Quranic verses with little or no emphasis on hadith. He also provided a new commentary on the Quran based on a re-translation of key verses, based on applying proper rules of classical Arabic and its conventions, which have been overlooked by the mainstream sects. As well as releasing a Quranic Dictionary (Lughat-ul-Quran) which translated many of the key words used in the Quran. Ghulam Ahmed Pervez did not reject all hadiths; however, he only accepted hadiths which "are in accordance with the Quran or do not stain the character of the Prophet or his companions".  The organization publishes and distributes books, pamphlets, and recordings of Pervez's teachings.

Non-affiliation
Tolu-e-Islam does not belong to any political party, nor does it belong to any religious group or sect . It is strictly against sectarianism, because such acts of creating sects/divisions in Islam is equal in magnitude to "Shirk" i.e. rejection of Monotheism. Tolu-e-Islam seeks to propagate the Quranic teachings so that the system of “Khilafat ‘Ala Minhaj-e-Risalat” (God's direct rule on Earth, where the Quran is the only source of derivation of law) is once again established.

See also
 Non-denominational Islam
 Tolu-e-Islam, a magazine of Muslims of British India and Pakistan

References

External links
 Tolu-e-Islam Homepage
 G.A. Pervez Audio,Video and books online
 About Quran

Islamic organizations established in 1938
Quranism